Angelos Vlachopoulos (born 28 September 1991) is a Greek water polo player. He won a bronze medal at the 2015 World Championships and competed at the 2016 Summer Olympics. He plays for Serbian club VK Novi Beograd.

Honours
Vouliagmeni

Greek Championship: 2011–12
Greek Cup: 2011–12
Olympiacos
Greek Championship: 2013–14, 2014–15, 2015–16
Greek Cup: 2013–14, 2014–15, 2015–16
LEN Champions League runners-up: 2015–16
AN Brescia
Serie A1: 2020–21
VK Novi Beograd
LEN Champions League runners-up: 2021–22
 Adriatic League: 2021–22
 Serbian Championship: 2021–22

Awards
Greek Championship MVP: 2015–16 with Olympiacos
LEN Champions League Top Scorer : 2020–21 with AN Brescia
Member of the World Team 2021 by total-waterpolo

See also
 List of World Aquatics Championships medalists in water polo

References

External links

 

Greek male water polo players
Olympiacos Water Polo Club players
Living people
1991 births
World Aquatics Championships medalists in water polo
Water polo players at the 2016 Summer Olympics
Olympic water polo players of Greece
Mediterranean Games medalists in water polo
Mediterranean Games silver medalists for Greece
Mediterranean Games bronze medalists for Greece
Competitors at the 2013 Mediterranean Games
Competitors at the 2018 Mediterranean Games
Water polo players at the 2020 Summer Olympics
Medalists at the 2020 Summer Olympics
Olympic silver medalists for Greece
Olympic medalists in water polo
Water polo players from Thessaloniki